The Porticoes of Bologna are an important cultural and architectural heritage of Bologna, Italy and represent a symbol of the city together with the numerous towers. No other city in the world has as many porticoes as Bologna: all together, they cover more than  only in the historic center, but can reach up to  if those outside the medieval city walls are also considered.

On account of their cultural and artistic significance, in 2021 the porticoes of Bologna have been declared an UNESCO World Heritage Site.

History 

The porticoes of Bologna were built almost spontaneously, probably in the early Middle Ages, as a projection of private buildings on public land, in order to increase living spaces. The first historical evidence dates back to  1041. In a first period the houses were increased by the expansion of upper floors and the creation of wooden projections. Over the years, the jetties increased in size and it was necessary to build support columns from below to prevent them from collapsing, thus creating the worldwide famous arcades.

In the following centuries the success of the arcades was determined by the need to cope with the strong increase in the presence of students and scholars at the University of Bologna, but also with immigration from the countryside. The expansion of the porticoes began in 1288, when a notice from the local municipality established that all new houses had to be built with a portico, while those already existing that did not have one were required to add it.  During all the Middle Ages, the arcades were made of wood, then, following a decree issued on 26 March 1568 by the pontifical governor Giovanni Battista Doria and the so-called gonfaloniere Camillo Paleotti, they were rebuilt with bricks or stones. Despite this, some buildings with wooden porticoes still survives today, like those in via Marsala or in Corte Isolani.

The Portico of San Luca is the city's and world's longest. It connects Porta Saragozza (one of the twelve gates of the ancient walls built in the Middle Ages, which circled a  part of the city) with the Sanctuary of the Madonna di San Luca, a church begun in 1723 on the site of an 11th-century edifice which had already been enlarged in the 14th century, prominently located on a hill ( high) overlooking the town, which is one of Bologna's main landmarks. The windy 666 vault arcades, almost four kilometres long, effectively links the Sanctuary of San Luca to the city centre. Its porticos provide shelter for the traditional procession which every year since 1433 has carried a Byzantine icon of the Madonna with Child attributed to Luke the Evangelist down to the Bologna Cathedral during the Feast of the Ascension.

Gallery

References

External links 
 UNESCO World Heritage: The Porticoes of Bologna

World Heritage Sites in Italy
Bologna
Emilia-Romagna